Finland was represented by Monica Aspelund, with the song "Lapponia", at the 1977 Eurovision Song Contest,  which took place on 7 May in London.

Before Eurovision

National final
The Finnish final was held on February 22 at the YLE TV Studios in Helsinki. It was hosted by Tutteli Mensonen. The winner was chosen by regional juries.

At Eurovision
On the night of the final Aspelund performed 16th in the running order following Italy and preceding Belgium. The Finnish entry was conducted by Ossi Runne. At the close of voting "Lapponia" had picked up 50 points, placing Finland 10th of the 18 entries.

Voting

Sources
Viisukuppila- Muistathan: Suomen karsinnat 1977 
Finnish national final 1977 on natfinals

External links
All national final performances on Yle Elävä Arkisto  

1977
Countries in the Eurovision Song Contest 1977
Eurovision